Lukas Cichos (born 18 December 1995) is a German footballer who plays as a goalkeeper for Germania Halberstadt.

Club career

1. FC Magdeburg
Cichos is a graduate of the 1. FC Magdeburg youth academy.

FSV Zwickau
In July 2017, Cichos was loaned out to 3. Liga side FSV Zwickau. He made his first and only league appearance during his loan on 5 May 2018 in a 1–0 home victory over Fortuna Köln.

Rot-Weiss Erfurt
In July 2018, Cichos moved to Regionalliga Nordost side Rot-Weiß Erfurt. He made his league debut for the club on 28 July 2018 in a 3–0 away victory over VSG Altglienicke.

References

External links
 Profile at FuPa.net
 

1995 births
Living people
People from Zeitz
Footballers from Saxony-Anhalt
German footballers
Association football goalkeepers
1. FC Magdeburg players
FSV Zwickau players
VfB Germania Halberstadt players
3. Liga players
Regionalliga players